Marianne Ihalainen (born 22 February 1967) is a retired Finnish ice hockey forward. She won a bronze medal as captain of the Finnish national team at the 1998 Winter Olympics and also won six IIHF World Women's Championship bronze medals, four IIHF European Women Championships gold medals and one bronze while representing Finland and was eight time SM-sarja Finnish Champion with Ilves. Ihalainen is regarded as one of the pioneers of women’s ice hockey in Finland and she was one of the first women inducted into the Hockey Hall of Fame Finland, alongside fellow trailblazer Riikka Sallinen.

After her retirement from playing in 2001, Ihalainen coached the Ilves women’s team during 2002–2006 and led the team to victory in the 2006 SM-sarja Finnish Championship. In 2006, she became the head coach and team manager of the Finnish national team. Under Ihalainen coaching, the Finnish national team won bronze medals at the 2008 and 2009 IIHF Women's World Championship and a bronze medal at the 2010 Winter Olympics.

At a ceremony held during the 2019 IIHF Women's World Championship in Espoo, she became the first woman to have her career formally honoured by the Finnish Ice Hockey Association.

Awards and honours

References

External links 
 

1967 births
Living people
Finnish women's ice hockey forwards
Ice hockey people from Tampere
Ilves Naiset players
Ice hockey players at the 1998 Winter Olympics
Medalists at the 1998 Winter Olympics
Olympic bronze medalists for Finland
Olympic ice hockey players of Finland
Olympic medalists in ice hockey
Ice hockey players with retired numbers